The United Nations University Office at UNESCO serves as academic interface between the United Nations University (UNU) and its Institutes and UNESCO and its Permanent Delegations in Paris, France. The UNU Office at UNESCO also develops contacts between UNU and other Paris-based international organisations as well with French academia.

The aim of the UNU Office at UNESCO is to make UNU a stakeholder and a full-fledged partner of the UNESCO system and the diplomatic environment in Paris.
The Office seeks to strengthen existing cooperation and to explore potential joint projects in areas of mutual interest to the two organisations.

To this end, the UNU Office at UNESCO organises public events aimed at presenting UNU's activities. It represents UNU at meetings of UNESCO, particularly the spring session of the Executive Board and the General Conference, major world conferences as well as more informal meetings.

References

External links
 United Nations University Office in Paris - Website
 UNU Office at UNESCO Facebook Page
 UNU Office at UNESCO Twitter Page
 United Nations University - Website

Organizations based in Paris
UNESCO
France and the United Nations